Nepali or Nepalese may refer to :

Concerning Nepal
 Anything of, from, or related to Nepal
 Nepali people, citizens of Nepal
 Nepali language, an Indo-Aryan language  found in Nepal, the current official national language and a language spoken in India
 Nepal Bhasa, a Sino-Tibetan language found in Nepal, formerly the official national language
 Nepalese literature
 Nepalese cuisine
 Nepalese culture
 Nepali cinema
 Nepali music

Other uses
 Nepali (film), a 2008 Indian Tamil-language film

See also

 Nepal (disambiguation)
 
 
 Languages of Nepal
 Nepal is a south Asian country with a population of nearly 30 million. 

Language and nationality disambiguation pages